Burnaia is a genus of marine nudibranch in the family Aeolidiidae containing the sole species Burnaia helicochorda. This species has not been reported since its original description.

References

External links

Aeolidiidae